Afghanistan Liberation Organization (Sazman-i Rihayi Afghanistan, abbr. ALO) is a Maoist political group in Afghanistan. It was founded by Dr. Faiz Ahmad and some others in 1973. ALO is one of several organizations that grew out of the Sholaye Javid (Eternal Flame) movement. ALO was originally named Revolutionary Group of the Peoples of Afghanistan (RGPA); it was renamed in 1980.

History
It was highly critical of the Soviet–Afghan War and actively fought against what it considered social imperialism. In June 1979, RGPA convened the Mujahedin Freedom Fighters Front of Afghanistan together with Islamist elements, as a united front against the pro-Soviet government.

Along with some other Islamist groups, RGPA directed a rebellion in Kabul and other cities on 5 August 1979, that became known as the Bala Hissar uprising. The uprising was suppressed by the government and tens of ALO cadres were killed and arrested. Some of the central committee members like Mohammad Mohsin, Mohammad Dawod and others were executed in the Pul-e-Charkhi prison.

ALO had many fronts against the Soviets and pro-Soviet Afghan communists in different parts of Afghanistan and was attacked by both the Soviet forces and the fundamentalist groups of Mujahideen. They lost over 120 of its cadres during the war.

Decline
Dr. Faiz Ahmad himself was assassinated on 12 November 1986, along with his 6 other comrades by the Hizb-e Islami militia of Gulbuddin Hekmatyar.

The organisation still exists as of 2019.

References

External links

1973 establishments in Afghanistan
Anti-Soviet factions in the Soviet–Afghan War
Banned communist parties
Communist militant groups
Communist parties in Afghanistan
Maoist organisations in Afghanistan
Political parties established in 1973
Political parties in Afghanistan